Laura Siegemund and Vera Zvonareva defeated Veronika Kudermetova and Elise Mertens in the final, 7–6(7–3), 7–5 to win the women's doubles title at the 2022 Miami Open.

Shuko Aoyama and Ena Shibahara were the defending champions, but they chose not to defend their title together. Aoyama partnered with Chan Hao-ching, but lost in the first round to Lyudmyla Kichenok and Jeļena Ostapenko. Shibahara partnered with Asia Muhammad, but lost in the second round to Alicja Rosolska and Erin Routliffe.

Seeds

Draw

Finals

Top half

Bottom half

Seeded teams
The following are the seeded teams. Seedings are based on WTA rankings as of March 7, 2022.

Other entry information

Wildcards

Alternates

Protected ranking

Withdrawals
  Alexa Guarachi /  Nicole Melichar-Martinez → replaced by  Alexa Guarachi /  Xu Yifan
  Barbora Krejčíková /  Kateřina Siniaková → replaced by  Magda Linette /  Sara Sorribes Tormo
  Ashlyn Krueger /  Robin Montgomery → replaced by  Ekaterina Alexandrova /  Yang Zhaoxuan
  Magda Linette /  Bernarda Pera → replaced by  Lidziya Marozava /  Sabrina Santamaria
  Petra Martić /  Shelby Rogers → replaced by  Alexandra Panova /  Anastasia Rodionova

References

External links
 Main draw

2022 WTA Tour
Doubles women